Paul Curran (born 5 October 1966) is a football manager and former player. He was born in Derry, Northern Ireland.

On 26 November 2006, Curran was appointed the manager of Larne F.C.

The Dundalk based former Larne captain had led the Inver Park side to the 2005 Irish Cup final and Premier Division safety that season.

During a distinguished playing career, Curran played for periods of time with Ards F.C., Finn Harps F.C. and Derry City F.C. of the League of Ireland, where he was team captain and won the treble in 1988–1989, as well as playing for Dundalk F.C.  He holds the record for the second-highest number of appearances for Derry City ever, a total of 518 appearances. His 500th appearance came in January 1999.

He made a total of 26 appearances for Finn Harps in the 1986–87 League of Ireland First Division season.

Curran scored twice as the League of Ireland XI beat the Welsh Football League 2–0 in Porthmadog in October 1994.

At Ards, he scored 12 goals in 122 total appearances making his Irish League debut at home to Larne on 12 November 1999. His last game was 29 October 2002 at Windsor Park in a County Antrim Shield game.

He gained managerial experience with Dundalk, where he was assistant manager to Trevor Anderson for three years, and also had a short spell as caretaker manager. He won the Player of the Year at Oriel Park in 2003.

His son, Ryan, currently plays for Finn Harps F.C.

Honours
 League of Ireland Premier Division: 2
 Derry City F.C. 1988–89, 1996–97 
  FAI Cup: 2
 Derry City F.C. 1989, 1995
 League of Ireland Cup: 4
 Derry City F.C. 1988/89, 1990/91, 1991/92, 1993/94

References

Football managers from Northern Ireland
Association footballers from Northern Ireland
Association football defenders
Finn Harps F.C. players
Derry City F.C. players
Ards F.C. players
Larne F.C. players
Dundalk F.C. players
Dundalk F.C. managers
League of Ireland players
League of Ireland managers
NIFL Premiership players
Sportspeople from Derry (city)
League of Ireland XI players
Living people
1966 births